is a former Japanese football player.

Playing career
Okayama was born in Nagoya on August 27, 1973. After graduating from high school, he joined his local club Nagoya Grampus Eight in 1992. He became a regular player as mainly offensive midfielder in 1995 season and he played many matches for a long time. The club won the champions 1995 and 1999 Emperor's Cup. In Asia, the club also won the 2nd place 1996–97 Asian Cup Winners' Cup. In 2005, he moved to Albirex Niigata. In 2007, he moved to Albirex Niigata Singapore. He retired end of 2008 season.

Club statistics

References

External links

1973 births
Living people
Association football people from Aichi Prefecture
Japanese footballers
J1 League players
Nagoya Grampus players
Albirex Niigata players
Association football midfielders